The Iran Technical and Vocational Training Organization or in brief I.R.T.V.T.O is one of the organizations affiliated to the Ministry of Cooperatives, Labour, and Social Welfare, which was formed from the merger of three educational institutions in 1980 in order to provide technical and vocational education. In addition to the central headquarters, this organization has 31 general administrations in provinces of Iran, an instructor training center, 552 Learning Center and over 11700 free technical and vocational schools. In order to achieve the latest science and technology news and to comply with international standards, the organization always tried to expand international relations, including with the International Labour Organization (ILO) and the International Organization for Vocational Training in other countries. In this regard, the organization, regardless of the interpretation of the overall organizational structure, carries out its activities only in the field of education, with the support of the research field.

History
The roots of the formation of the Technical and Vocational Training Organization of Iran go back to the approval of the internship and skills increase regulations on January 17, 1961 by the Supreme Labor Council of Iran.

After Iranian Revolution, the organization was formed in 1980 by merge of three educational units include the General Directorate of Vocational Education of the Ministry of Labor and Social Affairs, the Internship Fund and the Internship Center, called the Technical Education and Manpower Organization. In 1981, it was renamed to current name Technical and Vocational Training Organization of the country.

Structure
The Iran Technical and Vocational Training Organization is one of affiliated government agency of the Ministry of Cooperatives, Labour, and Social Welfare and it consists of the following three main cores:

 Deputy of Education
 Deputy of Research and Planning
 Deputy of Administrative and Support

The main mission
The main mission of the organization is skills training, research, production of educational standards and labor force evaluation. The Technical and Vocational Education Organization of the country, with the help of 552 permanent training centers and with the support of 11,700 private schools and 21,000 instructors, annually provides educational services to approximately 1.5 million people in both the public and private section.

The target groups
The target groups of the organization for skills training are: job seekers, employees (enterprises - unions and guilds), students and university graduates, conscripts, residents of deprived and country borders areas, vulnerable groups (Including female-headed households and working children), housewives, people with disabilities, villagers, nomads, prisoners and their families, recovering addicts, the socially disadvantaged, foreign nationals and refugees, and educators from other countries.

Instructor training center
The Instructor Training and Research Center (ITC) of the organization is one of the unique educational centers in the Middle East which through its 16 specialized departments, acts as a research and development unit of the organization and prepare background to transfer knowledge and application of new technologies.

The international arena
So far the organization has managed to holding 18 national skill competitions with the presence of more than 10,000 competitors from all over the Iran country. These acts led to prepare the national skills team and finally 9 participation in international competitions.

Also cooperation with United Nations High Commissioner for Refugees and Japan International Cooperation Agency (JICA), Korea International Cooperation Agency (KOICA), UNESCO, United Nations Industrial Development Organization (UNIDO), UNEVOC and BIBB is another international initiative.

See also
 The National Festival of Entrepreneurs in Iran
 Social Security Organization
 Ministry of Welfare and Social Security
 National Organization for Civil Registration of Iran
 Housing Foundation of Islamic Revolution

References

External links
 Iran Technical and Vocational Training Organization (TVTO)
 TVET Country Profile Iran
 Iran’s Technical and Vocational Training Organization (TVTO) on Mehrnews
 Iran Technical and Vocational Training Organization on ILO
 Technical and Vocational Training Organization (TVTO) on theIranproject
 TVTO: Technical and Vocational Training Organization on VOCED
 About TVTO on Ministry of Cooperatives Labour and Social Welfare's web

Educational organizations
Government agencies of Iran
Iran Technical and Vocational Training Organization
Ministry of Cooperatives Labour and Social Welfare (Iran)